Ulrika Bergquist, (born 2 December 1969) is a Swedish journalist and television presenter who works for TV4. She is a newsreader for the TV4 News and presenter of Nyhetsmorgon. She was previously the presenter of the TV4 Stockholm local news. She presented Cityliv, Sommarstockholm and Närbilden for the local Stockholm part of the TV4 news. She has also in the mid 1990s worked for Sveriges Radio.

References

External links 

Living people
1969 births
Swedish television personalities
Swedish women television presenters
Swedish women journalists
Place of birth missing (living people)